The 2009 World Ladies Snooker Championship was the 2009 edition of the World Women's Snooker Championship, first held in 1976, and was played at Cambridge Snooker Centre from 4 to 8 April. The tournament was won by Reanne Evans, who achieved her fifth consecutive world title by defeating Maria Catalano 5–2 in the final. Evans received £800 prize money for her win. She also made the highest  of the tournament, 89.

There were four round-robin qualifying groups of seven players each, with the top two players in each group progressing into the knockout stage. Hannah Jones, aged 12, won the under-21 title in an event run alongside the main tournament. Jones, partnering Jaique Ip, also won the double competition.

Main Draw

References 

2009 in English sport
2009 in snooker
2009 in women's sport
International sports competitions hosted by England
2009
April 2009 sports events in the United Kingdom